Georg Arnold (23 April 1621 in Feldsberg – 16 January 1676 in  Bamberg) was an Austrian composer and organist.

From 1649 he was court organist in Bamberg at the court of Fürstbischof Melchior Otto Voit von Salzburg.

Works

Vocal music 
 Liber primus sacrarum cantionum for 2-5 voices and instruments (Nürnberg, 1651)
 Operis secundi liber I missarum, psalmorum et Magnificat for 5 voices and instruments (Innsbruck, 1656)
 Liber II sacrarum cantionum for 4–7 voices and instruments (Innsbruck, 1661)
 Psalmi de Beata Maria Virgine for 3 voices and instruments (Innsbruck, 1662)
 Psalmi vespertini for 2 solo voices, ripieno choir and Instruments (Bamberg, 1663)
 Opus sextum. Tres missae pro defunctis et alia missa laudativa for 4–7 voices and instruments (Bamberg, 1665)
 Mottetae tredecim selectissimae de nomine Jesu for solo voice and instruments (Kempten, 1672)
 Prima pars. Quatuor missae for 4 voices and instruments (Bamberg, 1672/1673), republished as Missarum quaternio (Bamberg, 1675)

Instrumental music 
 Canzoni, ariae et sonatae for 1-4 violins, Violas and Bc. (Innsbruck, 1659)

References

1621 births
1676 deaths
17th-century classical composers